The First Fridays Devotion, also called the Act of Reparation to the Sacred Heart of Jesus, is a Catholic devotion to offer reparations for sins and which had its origin in the apparitions of Christ at Paray-le-Monial, France, reported by Saint Margaret Mary Alacoque in the 17th century. This devotion to the Sacred Heart of Jesus was fully approved by the Roman Catholic Church and several promises were made to those who practice the First Fridays Devotion, one of which included final perseverance.

History
The devotion of the nine First Fridays is based on visions reportedly received by the Visitation nun, Margaret Mary Alacoque, who promoted devotion to the Sacred Heart of Jesus. According to Alacoque, Christ said,

"In the excess of the mercy of My Heart, I promise you that My all powerful love will grant to all those who will receive Communion on the First Fridays, for nine consecutive months, the grace of final repentance: they will not die in My displeasure, nor without receiving the sacraments; and My Heart will be their secure refuge in that last hour."

The devotion consists of several practices that are performed on the first Fridays of nine consecutive months. On these days, a person is to attend Mass and receive the Eucharist. If the need arises, in order to receive communion in a state of grace, a person should also make use of the sacrament of penance before attending Mass. In many Catholic communities the practice of the Holy Hour of meditation during the Exposition of the Blessed Sacrament during the First Fridays is encouraged.

Promises of the devotion to the Sacred Heart of Jesus
The promises suggest that one "will be disposed to Christian discipleship through frequent reception of the sacraments."

 I will give them all of the graces necessary for their state of life. 
 I will establish peace in their houses. 
 I will comfort them in all their afflictions. 
 I will be their strength during life and above all during death. 
 I will bestow a large blessing upon all their undertakings. 
 Sinners shall find in My Heart the source and the infinite ocean of mercy. 
 Tepid souls shall grow fervent. 
 Fervent souls shall quickly mount to high perfection. 
 I will bless every place where a picture of My Heart shall be set up and honored. 
 I will give to priests the gift of touching the most hardened hearts. 
 Those who shall promote this devotion shall have their names written in My Heart, never to be blotted out. 
 I promise you in the excessive mercy of My Heart that My all-powerful love will grant to all those who shall receive communion on the First Friday in nine consecutive months the grace of final penitence; they shall not die in My disgrace nor without receiving their sacraments; My Divine Heart shall be their safe refuge in this last moment.

Liturgical praxis

In 1889, Pope Leo XIII permitted priests and bishops worldwide to offer one morning votive Mass of the Sacred Heart on the first Friday of each month in churches or oratories where special devotions to the Sacred Heart were held, provided no feast of the Lord, double of the first class, or privileged feria, vigil, or octave occurred on that day. This permission was retained in the 1962 Missal, which remains the authorized liturgical text for the extraordinary form of the Roman Rite under the terms of Pope Benedict XVI's Summorum Pontificum, though the rubrics were altered to restrict the use of this permission to first Fridays on liturgical days of the third and fourth class; additionally, the 1962 rubrics allow two such votive Masses to be said on first Fridays, with no requirement for these Masses to be said in the morning (evening Masses having been permitted by Pope Pius XII by his 1953 apostolic constitution Christus Dominus).

No specific permission for use of the votive Mass of the Sacred Heart on first Fridays exists in the rubrics of the Mass of Paul VI, though votive Masses of any kind are permitted on most weekdays in Ordinary Time on which no obligatory memorial, feast, or solemnity occurs.

References

External links
 A support community for those wanting to complete the First Fridays Devotion

Catholic devotions